As Bodas de Deus (literal English title: The Spousals of God) is a 1999 Portuguese comedy film directed by João César Monteiro. It was screened in the Un Certain Regard section at the 1999 Cannes Film Festival.

Cast
 Rita Durão - Joana de Deus
 João César Monteiro - João de Deus
 Joana Azevedo - Elena Gombrowicz
 José Airosa - Omar Raschid
 Manuela de Freitas - Sister Bernarda
 Luís Miguel Cintra - God's Messenger
 Ana Galvão - Leonor (as Ana Velazquez)
 José Mora Ramos - Inspector Pantaleão
 Fernando Mora Ramos - Psychiatrist
 Fernando Heitor - Butler Vasconcelos
 João Listz - Sparafucile
 Jean Douchet - Bardamu
 Filipa Araújo - Celestina
 Sofia Marques - Nun
 Teresa Negrão - Inês
 Paulo Miranda - Agostinho

Production

Development 
João César Monteiro, in 1995, planned to shoot "The Comedy of God" and "The Wedding of God" as one film, in two parts, which he titled "Theology of God". The first would take place in Lisbon, as would happen, and the second in Paris, as would never happen. The production constraints in Paris between 1996 and 1997 were such that César Monteiro abandoned these plans and considered that "Theology of God" would remain incomplete. The director went ahead with another project, Le Basin de J.W., filmed between May and June 1997. The terrible reception reserved for that film, the "disorientation" the director said he experienced during and after Le Bassin, the impossibility of resuming in Paris the shooting of "The Wedding of God", led him to reconsider the script for "The Wedding of God".  

This feature film is a Luso-French production, by Madragoa Filmes, RTP and Gemini Films. It closes the trilogy focused on the character of João de Deus, the protagonist, embodied in a poor devilish human good, with repeated autobiographical references, in a sarcastic and moody style. The intended result is to draw a caricature of someone less virtuous than vicious, author and actor of unqualified comedies in a hypocritical world, with abundant literary, artistic, and philosophical references. The film is dedicated to César Monteiro's wife, Margarita Gil, a director who collaborated with her husband on his works.

References

External links
 

1999 films
1999 comedy films
1990s Portuguese-language films
Films directed by João César Monteiro
Films produced by Paulo Branco
Portuguese comedy films